Babubhai Mehta was a writer of stories for Bollywood Hindi films. His notable work include the story of 1940 film Aurat, which was remade as Mother India in 1957.

Filmography

As writer

1941 Bahen
1940 Aurat 
1939 Ek Hi Raasta (writer) 
1939 Jeevan Saathi (writer) 
1938 Teen Sau Din Ke Baad (writer) 
1937 Jagirdar

References

External links
 

Indian male screenwriters
Living people
20th-century Indian writers
Year of birth missing (living people)
20th-century Indian male writers